Ipomoea polymorpha is a morning glory species that was first described by Swiss botanist Johann Jacob Roemer and Austrian botanist Josef August Schultes. It is endemic to Australia.

References

polymorpha
Endemic flora of Australia